The 71st Texas Legislature met from January 10, 1989, to May 29, 1989, and in six subsequent special called sessions (see below). All members present during this session were elected in the 1988 general elections.

Sessions

Regular Session: January 10, 1989 – May 29, 1989

1st Called Session: June 20, 1989 – July 18, 1989

2nd Called Session: November 14, 1989 – December 12, 1989

3rd Called Session: February 27, 1990 – March 28, 1990

4th Called Session: April 2, 1990 – May 1, 1990

5th Called Session: May 2, 1990 – May 30, 1990

6th Called Session: June 4, 1990 – June 7, 1990

Party summary

Senate

House of Representatives

Officers

Senate
 Lieutenant Governor: William P. Hobby, Jr., Democrat
 President Pro Tempore (regular session): John N. Leedom, Republican	
 President Pro Tempore (1st called session): J. E. "Buster" Brown, Republican
 President Pro Tempore (2nd called session): Kent A. Caperton, Democrat
 President Pro Tempore (3rd called session): Hugh Parmer, Democrat
 President Pro Tempore (4th-6th called sessions): Bob McFarland, Republican

House
 Speaker of the House: Gibson D. "Gib" Lewis, Democrat

Members

Senate

Sources
http://www.tsl.state.tx.us/ref/abouttx/holidays.html

http://www.lrl.state.tx.us/scanned/sessionOverviews/summary/soe70.pdf

References

External links

71st Texas Legislature
1989 in Texas
1989 U.S. legislative sessions